Atsushi Fujii (藤井 淳志, born May 20, 1981) is a retired Japanese professional outfielder. He spent his career playing for the Chunichi Dragons in Japan's Nippon Professional Baseball.

External links

NBP

1981 births
Living people
People from Toyohashi
Baseball people from Aichi Prefecture
University of Tsukuba alumni
Japanese expatriate baseball players in the Dominican Republic
Nippon Professional Baseball outfielders
Chunichi Dragons players
Tigres del Licey players